The 1984 East Coast Conference men's basketball tournament was held March 7–10, 1984.  The champion gained and an automatic berth to the NCAA tournament.

Bracket and results

* denotes overtime game

All-Tournament Team
 Jaye Andrews, Bucknell
 Fred Lee, Rider
 Cal Puriefoy, Bucknell
 Kevin Thomas, Rider – Tournament MVP
 Ed Sigl, Bucknell

Source

References

East Coast Conference (Division I) men's basketball tournament
Tournament